{{Infobox person
| name = Danny Greene
| image = DannyGreene.gangster.png
| caption = Danny Greene circa. 1970s
| birth_name = Daniel John Patrick Greene
| birth_date = 
| birth_place = Cleveland, Ohio, U.S.
| death_date = 
| death_place = Lyndhurst, Ohio, U.S. 
| death_cause = Car bomb
| occupation = Longshoreman, dock worker, teamster, mobster, racketeer, Mafia family associate
| known_for =  Former associate of Cleveland mobster John NardiWar with the Cleveland Mafia
}}

Daniel John Patrick Greene (November 14, 1933 – October 6, 1977) was an Irish-American organized crime figure based in Cleveland, Ohio. Greene gained power first in the local chapter of the International Longshoremen's Association, where he was elected president during the early 1960s. He later became a full time crime boss and began competing with Jewish-American organized crime figure Shondor Birns and the Italian-American Cleveland crime family  for control of the city's criminal underworld. Greene set up his own crew called the Celtic Club, complete with enforcers and a close alliance with outlaw biker gangs.

During the 1970s, Greene allied himself with mob-affiliated labor union leader John Nardi during the latter's war against Jack Licavoli for leadership of the Cleveland crime family. Competing factions set off more than 36 bombs, most attached to cars, in murder attempts, many successful. After the humiliating failure of multiple attempts of his life and Greene's decision to repeatedly taunt the Licavoli faction as "maggots" in the Cleveland news media, Greene was successfully assassinated in 1977 by Los Angeles crime family enforcers Ray Ferritto and Ronald Carabbia. 

A subsequent police investigation revealed that Greene's murder had been a criminal conspiracy by the Italian-American crime families in Cleveland, New York City, and Southern California. The investigation also resulted in the defections of both Ray Ferritto and Los Angeles crime family boss Jimmy Fratianno, followed by the exposure and arrest of a mole inside the Cleveland FBI. The investigation also laid the groundwork for many successful Federal prosecutions of the Italian-American Mafia in multiple cities nationwide.

Early life and education
Daniel John Patrick "Danny" Greene was born November 14, 1933, in Cleveland, Ohio, to John Henry Greene and Irene Cecelia Greene (née Fallon). His father was also born in Cleveland, but his mother was born in Pennsylvania.

Three days after his birth, Greene's mother died.  He was called "Baby Greene" until his mother was buried, after which he was eventually named after his grandfather (Daniel John Greene). Danny's father drank heavily and eventually lost his job as a salesman for Fuller Brush. After this, Danny temporarily moved in with his grandfather (a newspaper printer), who had also been recently widowed. Unable to provide for Danny, his father placed him in Parmadale, a Roman Catholic orphanage in Parma, Ohio, three miles outside Cleveland.

In 1939, Danny's father began dating a nurse. He married her, and they started their own family and brought Danny to live with them.

At age 6, Danny resented his stepmother and ran away on several occasions. His paternal grandfather took him in, and Danny lived with him and an aunt for the rest of his childhood in the Collinwood neighborhood. Taking advantage of the fact that his grandfather worked nights, Danny roamed the streets at night. When Danny's father died in 1959, the newspaper obituary listed his children from his second marriage but did not mention Danny. 

Danny attended St. Jerome Catholic School, where he developed a great fondness for the nuns and priests,  developed a lasting friendship with some of his teachers, and served as an altar boy. He was athletic, excelled at baseball, and was an all-star basketball player. Although Danny was a poor student, the nuns at St. Jerome let him play sports because he was valuable to the team.

Danny attended St. Ignatius High School. There he frequently fought with Italian-American students, children of more recent immigrants struggling for a place, and he developed an intense dislike for Italians that lasted his entire life.

After being expelled from Saint Ignatius, he transferred to Collinwood High School, where he excelled in athletics. He was also a Boy Scout for a short time, before being kicked out of his troop. He was also expelled from Collinwood High School, in that case, due to excessive tardiness, which he claimed was caused by the bullying of fellow students.

Military service
After being expelled from Collinwood High School in 1951, Greene enlisted in the United States Marine Corps, where he was soon noticed for his abilities as a boxer and marksman. He was stationed for a time at Marine Corps Base Camp Lejeune, Jacksonville, North Carolina and was transferred many times, possibly because of behavioral issues. Promoted to the rank of corporal in 1953, Greene taught new junior Marines how to be artillerymen. He was honorably discharged later that year.

Waterfront
In the early 1960s, Greene worked steadily as a longshoreman at the Cleveland docks, years before the work was unionized by the International Longshoremen's Association (ILA). In his free time he read about Ireland and its turbulent history, and began to think of himself as a "Celtic warrior". Some writers have speculated that reading about such warriors inspired his criminal ambitions. In 1961, the ILA removed the president of the local union. Greene was chosen to serve as interim president and handily won the next election. Once president, Greene had the union office painted green (to represent his Irish ethnicity) and installed thick green carpeting. He was known to drive a green car, wear green jackets, and often handed out green ink pens.

In office, he raised dues 25% and pushed workers to perform "volunteer" hours to assist in providing a "building fund". Those who refused often found themselves losing work. He fired more than  50 members while denouncing them as "winos and bums" to other workers.

Greene led sometimes violent protests and strikes to force the stevedore companies to allow the ILA to oversee the hiring of dockworkers. As a prerequisite to landing a job as a longshoreman, many workers had to unload grain from the ships on a temporary basis and turn their paychecks over to Greene.  Said to have been collected to build a union hall, most of the funds ended up in Greene's personal bank account.

An unidentified ILA member would later recall about Greene, "He read On the Waterfront. He imagined himself a tough dock boss. But he was thirty years too late. He used workers to beat up union members who did not come in line, but he was never seen fighting himself. He was a spellbinding speaker and a good organizer."

As a union organizer, Greene sometimes declared work stoppages, as frequently as 25 per day, to demonstrate to company owners his authority on the docks. On one occasion, he threatened to murder the two children of one owner, and the FBI put the man's house and family under protection.

After Sam Marshall, an investigative reporter, collected affidavits that supported charges of extortion, Greene was exiled from the union and convicted of embezzlement. The conviction was later overturned on appeal.

Rather than face a second trial, Greene pleaded guilty to the lesser charge of falsifying union records, was fined $10,000, and received a suspended sentence. Afterward, he did not pay the fine nor receive any prison time.

After returning to his rackets, Greene met and befriended Teamsters boss Louis Triscaro, who introduced Greene to Jimmy Hoffa. After the friendly meeting, Hoffa later reportedly said to Triscaro, "Stay away from that guy. There's something wrong with him."

Marty McCann, of the Organized Crime Division of the FBI, recruited Greene as an informant. Greene passed along information to the FBI and became a top-echelon confidential informant, but only that which suited his personal needs, and he would not hurt those close to him.

Greene's codename was "Mr. Patrick", a reflection on his Irish pride. It was his confirmation name and that of his beloved Irish saint.

Protected by his informant status, Greene increased his criminal activities. By 1964, the union members were fed up with Greene's behavior.

The Plain Dealer began writing a nine-part investigative series about him. The series brought Greene unwanted attention from the U.S. Attorney, the Internal Revenue Service, the Labor Department, and the Cuyahoga County prosecutor. 

The ILA began its own investigation and soon removed Greene from office. Eventually, Greene was convicted in federal court of embezzling $11,500 in union funds and on two counts of falsifying records. The verdict was overturned by an appeals court, and federal prosecutors and Greene negotiated a settlement of Greene's guilty plea in exchange for two misdemeanor charges and a $10,000 fine, but he paid only a fraction of it.

Criminal career
Greene was hired by the Cleveland Solid Waste Trade Guild to "keep the peace". Impressed with his abilities, mobster Alex "Shondor" Birns hired him as an enforcer for his various "numbers" operators. Additionally, the Cleveland Mafia family underboss, Frank "Little Frank" Brancato, used Greene and other Irish-American gangsters, during the 1960s, to act as errand boys and as muscle men to enforce the Mafia's influence over the garbage-hauling contracts and other rackets.

Until his death in 1973, Brancato reportedly regretted having brought Greene into the mob due to the damage Greene did. For example, in May 1968, under Birns's orders, Greene was supposed to attack a black numbers man who was holding out on protection money due. Unfamiliar with the military-type detonator, Greene barely made it out of his car before the bomb exploded. He survived being thrown nearly 20 feet, although the hearing in his right ear was damaged for life. He told the police a story about what had occurred, and thereafter would only trust professionals to handle bombs for him. 

"Big Mike" Frato broke away from the Cleveland Solid Waste Trade Guild and founded the more legitimate trade group called the Cuyahoga County Refuse Haulers Association. A legitimate businessman, he protested Greene's bringing mob involvement and strong-arm tactics to the guild (although he had his own connections). The Cleveland Solid Waste Trade Guild fell apart shortly thereafter.

In September 1970, Greene instructed Art Sneperger to place a bomb on Frato's car, but Sneperger had second thoughts and told Frato. Sneperger was a police informant and told Sgt. Edward Kovacic of the Cleveland Police intelligence unit about Greene's plans and Greene's role as an FBI informant. Greene once again ordered  Sneperger to plant a bomb on Frato's car in 1971. The bomb detonated before Sneperger  could get away, killing him and sparing Frato, who was across the street. 

Some investigators believed the premature explosion was caused by a radio signal, possibly from a short wave radio or a passing police car. Others thought  that Birns and Greene killed Sneperger after learning he was an informant. Sgt. Kovacic was told by an underworld source that Greene had pushed the detonator, killing Sneperger instantly. The case was never officially solved.

On November 26, 1971, Frato was shot and killed at Cleveland's White City Beach. Greene was arrested and interrogated. He admitted to the killing but claimed self-defense. He said Frato had fired three shots at Greene, who was jogging and exercising his dogs, and fired one back. Evidence seemed to corroborate Greene's story, and he was released. Cleveland police later learned Frato was armed and had an opportunity to kill Greene several weeks prior to the White Beach shooting. During their partnership, Greene and Frato had become so close that they had named sons after each other.

Not long afterward, Greene again found himself a target while jogging in White City Beach. A sniper, concealed several hundred feet away, fired several shots at Greene from a rifle. Instead of ducking to the ground, Greene pulled out his revolver and started shooting, while running toward his would-be assassin. The sniper fled and was never positively identified. Investigators learned that this attempt was part of a murder contract left by Birns. Greene left his wife and their three children for their own safety and moved to Collinwood, where he rented an apartment.

Journalist Ned Whelan wrote about Greene: "Imagining himself as a feudal baron, he supported a number of destitute Collinwood families, paid tuition to Catholic schools for various children and, like the gangsters of the Twenties, actually had 50 twenty-pound turkeys delivered to needy households on Thanksgiving." He often picked up restaurant tabs for friends, neighbors, and acquaintances, and left generous tips. Greene evicted a bookmaker who operated out of a small Waterloo business, and kept a local bar in order by making personal visits. When a rowdy group of Hells Angels moved into Collinwood, Greene visited their headquarters with a stick of dynamite. He threatened to light it and throw it into their club house until they came out to hear his warning to keep things quiet while in Collinwood.

The Celtic Club
Greene formed his own crew of young Irish-American gangsters, called "The Celtic Club". His main enforcers were Keith "The Enforcer" Ritson, Kevin McTaggart, Brian O'Donnell, Danny Greene Jr., Billy McDuffy, Elmer Brittain, Ernest "Ted" Waite, Art "Snep" Snepereger and Jimmy "Icepick" Sterling who set up gambling dens across the city. He also allied with John Nardi, a Cleveland crime family labor racketeer who wanted to overthrow the leadership.

The relationship between Greene and Birns began to sour. Greene had asked Birns for a loan of $75,000 to set up a "cheat spot" (speakeasy and gambling house). Birns arranged for it through the Gambino crime family, but the money was lost in the hands of Birns's courier Billy Cox, who used it to purchase cocaine. The police raided Cox's house, arrested him, and seized the narcotics and what was left of the $75,000. The Gambino family wanted their money, and Birns pressed Greene, who refused to return it, reminding Birns that he could not return something he had never received and that Birns was responsible for it, since Birns's courier had lost it.

To settle the dispute, Birns directed an associate to hire a hitman for Greene, gave him $25,000 for the job, and noted it should be carried out even in the event of any harm befalling Birns. Several minor underworld characters, burglars by trade, took the contract, but their numerous assassination attempts on Greene failed.

Not long afterward, Greene found an unexploded bomb in his car when he pulled into a Collinwood service station to get gas. The explosive was wired improperly and failed to detonate. Greene disassembled the bomb himself, removed the dynamite, and brought the rest of the package to a policeman, Edward Kovacic. Kovacic offered him police protection, but Greene refused it. He also refused to hand over the bomb, stating, "I'm going to send this back to the old bastard that sent it to me". 

Suspecting that Birns had ordered the hit, Greene decided to retaliate. On March 29, 1975, Holy Saturday, the eve of Easter, Birns was blown up by a bomb containing C-4, a potent military explosive, in the lot behind Christy's Lounge, formerly Jack & Jill West Lounge, a go-go spot at 2516 Detroit Ave. near St. Malachi's Church.

On May 12, another explosion rocked Collinwood. Greene's building  at 15805 Waterloo Road was destroyed, but he sustained only minor injuries. As the second floor fell, he was shielded from the debris by a refrigerator that had lodged against a wall. A second, more powerful bomb failed to explode, for which Greene credited the intercession of St. Jude, whose medal he always wore around his neck.

In 1975, Greene began to push into the vending machine racket, traditionally controlled by the Mafia, as well as muscled into gambling operations. This angered the Cleveland family leadership, especially the soldier Thomas "The Chinaman" Sinito. Greene controlled some of the more lucrative laundry contracts that Sinito wanted, and  Sinito deemed the excessive fees Greene charged for coin-operated laundry contracts extortion.

Sinito and mob soldier Joseph "Joey Loose" Iacobacci murdered one of Greene's associates. In retaliation, Greene had dynamite wired to the frame of Sinito's car, but Sinito found the bomb, removed and disarmed it, and later destroyed it. 

In Greene's competition with the Mafia to build a vending machine empire, John Conte became a victim. Conte owned a vending machine company (that provided slot machines to various private clubs and parties) while working as a route man for another one. Conte was also a close friend of Joseph Gallo's.

On the day of Conte's disappearance, he told his wife he had a meeting with Greene. That was the last time she saw him; his badly beaten corpse was discovered a few days later at a dump site in Austintown.

Police investigators theorized that Conte was beaten to death in Greene's trailer and his body later transported to Austintown. They found some physical evidence, but Greene was never charged with Conte's murder.

In 1976, longtime mobster John Scalish died, leaving control of Cleveland's lucrative criminal operations, specifically the city's Teamsters Union locals, up for grabs. Scalish had appointed James Licavoli as his successor, but other mobsters, such as John Nardi, challenged Licavoli for leadership of the organization.

Within weeks, with Greene's assistance, Nardi had many of Licavoli's supporters killed, including Licavoli's underboss, Leo "Lips" Moceri. The Cleveland family's enforcer, Eugene "The Animal" Ciasullo, was seriously injured and sidelined for several months by a car bomb. Soon afterward, a bomb planted in Alfred "Allie" Calabrese's car killed an innocent man: Frank Pircio, of Collinwood, died while moving Calabrese's Lincoln Continental before getting his own car out of their shared driveway.

This began a longstanding war between Licavoli's Cleveland crime family and Greene's Celtic Club.  In 1976 alone, 36 bombs exploded around the Cleveland area, which was soon given the moniker "Bomb City, U.S.A." The ATF tripled its staffing in northeast Ohio in order to handle the bomb investigations. A suspected bombmaker, Martin Heidtman, was arrested but was released for lack of evidence. Rick Porrello reported in his book, To Kill The Irishman, that Greene, using bombs or bullets, killed at least eight of the Mafia hit men sent to assassinate him.

Final days

Media personality
After the Waterloo Road bombing failed to kill him, Greene played up the stories of the Mafia's failed assassination attempts to his benefit. His bravado and flamboyant behaviour only added to his growing aura of invincibility and power in the urban legends of the Cleveland criminal underworld. Greene granted interviews to local television stations;  for a newspaper photographer, posed proudly in front of a boarded-up window of his destroyed apartment building; and during a televised interview said to one television reporter,

The luck of the Irish is with me and I have a message for those yellow maggots. That includes the payers and the doers. The doers are the people who carried out the bombing. They have to be eliminated because the people who paid them can't afford to have them remain alive. And the payers are going to feel great heat from the FBI and the local authorities ... And let me clear something else up. I didn't run away from the explosion. Someone said they saw me running away. I walked away.

In response to the reporter's assertion that, like a cat, Greene had nine lives, Greene said, "I am an Irish Catholic. I believe that the Guy upstairs pulls the strings, and you're not going to go until he says so. It just wasn't my time yet."

In another televised interview, Greene denied any knowledge of the underworld war. He said, "I have no axe to grind, but if these maggots in this so-called Mafia want to come after me, I'm over here by the Celtic Club. I'm not hard to find."

Assassination

On May 17, 1977, Greene's longtime ally John Nardi was killed by a bomb, planted by Pasquale Cisternino and Ronald Carabbia. After Nardi was murdered, Licavoli arranged a ceasefire with Greene, hoping to catch him off-guard and then have him killed.

Shortly after their meeting, Greene muscled in on a large West Side gambling operation originally run by Nardi. Greene offered a percentage to Licavoli, who declined it.

On October 6, 1977, Greene went to a dental appointment at the Brainard Place office building in Lyndhurst, Ohio. Members of the Mafia had tapped his phone and knew about the appointment. After Greene had visited a dentist and left the office building, he approached his car. The automobile parked next to his exploded, killing Greene instantly. The car bomb was believed to have been planted by a hitman known as Ray Ferritto.

Greene's remains were cremated on October 8, 1977, and he was buried at Calvary Cemetery in Cleveland.

Aftermath
Ray Ferritto was arrested in relation to Greene's murder. Ferritto implicated Jimmy Fratianno in the planning of the murder, and Fratianno was indicted for charges related to the bombing. Fearing for his safety, Fratianno agreed to become a government witness against the Mafia. In return for his testimony, he pleaded guilty to the murder charges and received a five-year prison sentence, of which he served 21 months. In 1980, after testifying for the government that led to the racketeering convictions of five reputed Mafia figures, Fratianno entered the federal Witness Protection Program.

In popular culture
Rick Porrello, a former Cleveland-area police lieutenant, wrote To Kill The Irishman: The War that Crippled the Mafia (1998), about Greene's engagement with the Mafia. He won a national non-fiction award for the book. 
Porrello's book was adapted as a movie first entitled The Irishman: The Legend of Danny Greene.
The biopic Kill the Irishman (2011), which loosely chronicles Greene's life, was directed by Jonathan Hensleigh, stars Ray Stevenson as Greene, and received favorable reviews. 
The Law & Order season 11 episode, "Brother's Keeper", is based on Greene's case.

References

English, T.J. Paddy Whacked: The Untold Story of the Irish-American Gangster. Regan Books, 2005.

External links
Danny Greene: The Most Influential Mobster You've Never Heard Of by Rick Porrello
Danny Greene at the Crime Library
Kill the Irishman: The real story behind the movie about Danny Greene (timeline)

1933 births
1977 deaths
1977 murders in the United States
Gangsters from Cleveland
American trade union officials convicted of crimes
American gangsters
American crime bosses
Federal Bureau of Investigation informants
United States Marine Corps non-commissioned officers
People murdered by the Cleveland crime family
Murdered American gangsters of Irish descent
People murdered in Ohio
Deaths by car bomb in the United States
Saint Ignatius High School (Cleveland) alumni
Irish-American culture in Ohio
People convicted of embezzlement